The Northern Sun men's basketball tournament in 2010 was won by the team representing St. Cloud State University.

Bracket

First round

(1) Minnesota State vs. (8) SW Minnesota St.

(4) Winona State vs. (5) University of Mary

(2) St. Cloud State vs. (5) Concordia-St. Paul

(3) Augustana vs. (5) Wayne State

Semifinals

(8) SW Minnesota State vs. (4) Winona State

(2) St. Cloud State vs. (6) Wayne State

Championship

(8) SW Minnesota State vs. (2) St. Cloud State

References

North Sun Intercollegiate Conference men's basketball tournament
Northern Sun Intercollegiate Conference men's basketball
Basketball in Minnesota
North Sun Intercollegiate Conference men's basketball tournament